Helen Modern (born 16 February 1983) is an English actress best known for her recurring role as Naomi in British sitcom, Respectable on Five. In 2006 she also starred in the eighth series of ITV1 drama Bad Girls as inmate Stella Gough, the daughter of Governing Governor Joy Masterton. As well as her featured roles in Respectable and Bad Girls, Helen has also had a recurring role in BBC One daytime soap opera, Doctors (2005) as Diane Bishop and various roles in No Angels, Wire in the Blood, The Chase and Messiah - The Harrowing with Ken Stott and Maxine Peake.

Other Roles
In 2008 Helen featured as mouthy rock chick Sasha Reed on the new Shed Productions commission Rock Rivals, as well as working with comedy writer Jeremy Dyson on his new commission for BBC. She also shot a series of commercials with director James Griffiths for the new "Pasta Hut" pizza hut commercials.

Early life

She was born in Chester, and grew up in Preston in the North West of England.

Her drama school training took place at Queen Margaret University, Edinburgh where she graduated with a BA in Acting with distinction in 2004.

External links
 

Alumni of Queen Margaret University
English television actresses
People from Chester
1983 births
Living people